Mellenville, now known as Mellenville Grange, is a historic train station and Grange located in the hamlet of Mellenville, in the town of Claverack in Columbia County, New York.  It was built in around 1900 by the Boston and Albany Railroad on their Hudson Branch. It is a one-story brick building with a slate covered hipped roof. It features heavy wood and scroll-sawn brackets that support the roof overhang.  Also on the property is a contributing privy. The building ceased to be used as a station in the 1930s, when it was acquired by the Grange.

It was listed on the National Register of Historic Places in 2000 as the Mellenville Railroad Station.

References

External links
Train Station Mellenville NY, by Alan Lampson (Panoramio)

Queen Anne architecture in New York (state)
Railway stations in the United States opened in 1900
Railway stations on the National Register of Historic Places in New York (state)
Grange organizations and buildings in New York (state)
Former Boston and Albany Railroad stations
National Register of Historic Places in Columbia County, New York
Railway stations in Columbia County, New York
1900 establishments in New York (state)
Former railway stations in New York (state)
Transportation in Columbia County, New York